Yeni Yüzyıl (New Century) was a Turkish newspaper. It was published from 1994 to 1999, closing down due to legal and financial problems. It had been acquired in August 1998 from Dinç Bilgin's Sabah group by Korkmaz Yiğit.

References

Turkish-language newspapers
Publications established in 1994
1994 establishments in Turkey
1999 disestablishments in Turkey
Defunct newspapers published in Turkey
Publications disestablished in 1999
Daily newspapers published in Turkey